The 1914 International Cross Country Championships was held in Amersham, England, at the Chesham Park on 28 March 1914.  A report on the event was given in the Glasgow Herald.

Complete results, medallists, 
 and the results of British athletes were published.

Medallists

Individual Race Results

Men's (10 mi / 16.1 km)

Team Results

Men's

Participation
An unofficial count yields the participation of 45 athletes from 5 countries.

 (9)
 (9)
 (9)
 (9)
 (9)

See also
 1914 in athletics (track and field)

References

International Cross Country Championships
International Cross Country Championships
Cross
International Cross Country Championships
International Cross Country Championships
Cross country running in the United Kingdom
Amersham
20th century in Buckinghamshire
Sport in Buckinghamshire